Donald Hall Kennedy MM (1888 – 18 November 1916) was a Scottish footballer who played in the Scottish League for Abercorn, Arthurlie and Vale of Leven as a forward and half back.

Personal life 
Prior to the First World War, Kennedy worked as a sculptor in Cathcart. He served as a sergeant in the Highland Light Infantry during the war and was awarded the Military Medal during the course of his service. Kennedy was killed at Beaumont-Hamel on 18 November 1916 and was buried in Serre Road Cemetery No. 1.

Career statistics

References

British Army personnel of World War I
British military personnel killed in the Battle of the Somme
1888 births
1916 deaths
People from Ardrossan
Scottish footballers
Scottish male sculptors
Association football forwards
Association football outside forwards
Association football wing halves
Association football fullbacks
Highland Light Infantry soldiers
Scottish Football League players
Arthurlie F.C. players
Scottish military personnel
Vale of Leven F.C. players
Abercorn F.C. players
Recipients of the Military Medal
20th-century Scottish male artists